The Lokrume helmet fragment is a decorated eyebrow piece from a Swedish helmet dating from the Viking Age. Discovered in Lokrume, a small settlement on the island of Gotland, it was first published in 1907 and is in the collection of the Gotland Museum. It is made of iron, the surface of which is decorated with silver and niello that forms an interlaced pattern.

The fragment is from around the 10th century AD, and is one of five Viking helmets to survive in any condition; the others are another fragment from Gotland, one from Kyiv, the Tjele helmet fragment from Denmark, and the Gjermundbu helmet from Norway. These are all examples of the "crested helmets" that entered use in Europe around the 6th century and are derivatives of the earlier Anglo-Saxon and Vendel Period helmets.

Description

The Lokrume helmet fragment is the remnant of the eyebrow piece, and part of the nose guard, from a helmet. An iron core was either coated or inlaid with silver, which was itself inlaid with niello. The inlaid pattern stretches the width of the fragment, though much of the sinister portion is now lost. The pattern is symmetrical, patterned with intertwined bands and circles. Transverse bands further adorn the area around this pattern.

Discovery
The fragment was discovered in Lokrume, a small settlement on the Swedish island of Gotland. The circumstances of its discovery are otherwise unknown. It was first described in print in the academic journal Fornvännen in 1907; the two-sentence mention, which included a drawing, stated that the piece was in the collection of Visby Fornsal—now known as the Gotland Museum. The museum still holds the piece in its collection, where it is catalogued as GF B 1683.

Typology

Though the context in which the fragment was found is now unknown, the style of interlaced pattern dates to around the tenth century AD. This places the fragment squarely within the Viking Age, which lasted from the end of the eighth century to the middle of the eleventh. Remains of only four other Viking Age helmets are known: another fragment from Gotland, in Högbro, the Tjele helmet fragment from Denmark, and a fragment from Kyiv, Ukraine, in addition to the Gjermundbu helmet found in Norway. The Lokrume piece was the first of these to be identified; the Tjele fragment was discovered in 1850, but mistaken for a saddle mounting until 1984. Like the other four, the fragment from Lokrume appears to be a descendant of the earlier Scandinavian Vendel Period and Anglo-Saxon helmets, and the end of the line of "crested helmets" that appeared in Europe around the sixth century.

References

Bibliography
  
 
 
  
  
 
  
 
 
 
 
  
  

10th-century artifacts
Archaeological discoveries in Sweden
Individual helmets
Medieval helmets